Nyewood is a hamlet in the Chichester district of West Sussex, England situated in the Western Rother valley. The village is on an unclassified road between Rogate and South Harting, the hub of the Harting civil parish that also includes the smaller settlements at West and East Harting.  In former times it was also an intermediate station on the ”Middy”, a rural railway line that ran between Petersfield and Midhurst. Despite its small size the area supports some notable businesses including Ballard's independent brewery whose hallmark brew is named after the hamlet. It is in the civil parish of Harting.
Nyewood resident Albert William Bleach was born in the village and lived there until his death at the age of 99, he was appointed MBE for his services to the community

The Nyewood Nye committee 
The Nyewood Nye committee are a group of people who arrange activities in the Nyewood 'Henry Warren village hall'.

References

External links

Villages in West Sussex
Chichester District